This is a list of international trips made by Natalia Gavrilița, the Prime Minister of Moldova (6 August 2021 – 16 February 2023). 

During her term in office, she made:

2021

2022

2023

References 

Foreign relations of Moldova